Manambu is one of the Ndu languages of Sepik River region of northern Papua New Guinea. A Manambu-based pidgin is used with speakers of Kwoma. Manambu has been extensively documented by Alexandra Aikhenvald in a comprehensive grammar.

External links 
 Paradisec has a collection of Don Laycock's (DL1) that include Manambu language materials

References

Alexandra Aikhenvald (2008), The Manambu Language of East Sepik, Papua New Guinea. Oxford University Press.

Languages of East Sepik Province
Ndu languages